Vigilant (launched 1801) was the second of twelve cutters of the Revenue Marine, or Revenue Cutter Service, later  the United States Coast Guard, to bear the name, Vigilant.

Operational history
Vigilant was commanded by Jno. W. Leonard who was commissioned as a captain in the Revenue Marine on May 31, 1798 in New York. W.S.  Jno. Squire was commissioned as first mate on Dec 31, 1797 in New York. N. Harriott was commissioned as third mate on Mar 1, 1797 in New York. W. Oliver was commissioned as third mate on Dec 31, 1798 in New York.

References
Early History of the United States Revenue Marine Service or (United States Revenue Cutter Service 1789-1849) by Captain Commandant Horatio Davis Smith, 1932 (reprinted in 1989)

Ships of the United States Revenue Cutter Service
1797 ships